Vitéz Kocsárd Janky de Bulcs (11 February 1868 – 20 October 1954) was a Hungarian military officer, who served as Chief of Army Staff between 1922 and 1930.

Biography
Kocsárd Janky was in Déva, Transylvania, then Kingdom of Hungary in 1868 to Lieutenant General Lajos Janky. He first studied at Kőszeg then at the Theresian Military Academy in Wiener Neustadt. He was commissioned as a Hussar Second lieutenant into the Imperial and Royal 1st Hussar Regiment. In 1909 he was the Chief of Staff in the 1st Cavalry Division at Temesvár with the rank of Major.

He fought in the First World War as commandant of the Imperial and Royal 4th Hussar Regiment. For the heroic Battle of Luck he was awarded the Knights Cross of the Military Order of Maria Theresa in 1922.
He fought in 1917 on the Italian front and in 1918 he was transferred to Transylvania. He was a prisoner of war in 1919.

After releasing from captivity he fought against the communists in Hungary on the side of Miklós Horthy.
In the Hungarian National Army he was commanding a Brigade at Szeged.

In 1922 he became the Chief of Army Staff of the Royal Hungarian Army. From 1925 he was also the Commandant of the Army.
In 1930 he went into retirement, because Gyula Gömbös was made a major general and appointed Minister of Defense in the Bethlen government by Horthy without asking him.
After his retirement he lived in his apartment in Budapest until 1951. Communist power relocated him to Debrecen where he died in 1954.

References

Sources
A Vitézi Rend honlapja
Janky Kocsárd kitüntetései
Shvoy Kálmán titkos naplója és emlékirata. 1918-1945. Perneky Mihály (szerk.), Kossuth Könyvkiadó, Budapest, 1983.

1868 births
1954 deaths
Hungarian soldiers
Austro-Hungarian military personnel of World War I
Austro-Hungarian Army officers
People from Deva, Romania